Appota Corporation is the developer and provider of creative platforms for Vietnam’s digital entertainment industry. Appota's core business includes digital content production and distribution, eSports, advertising, gaming creators, online payment, cloud computing, IoT and business management. Appota's customers are individuals, game and app developers, advertising partners, e-commerce partners

There are 4 subsidiary companies owned by Appota Group: Gamota (Game publishing company), Adsota (Digital Marketing company), AppotaPay (Payment & Fintech company), Kdata (Cloud infrastructure solutions company).

History

2011 
12/12/2011, Appota was founded in the first Topica Founder Institute in Vietnam.

2012 
 07/2012, Received the Most Disruptive Award from Founder Institute.
 11/2012, Delivered marketing service for international branches including NHN, UC, Kakao and Zepto Labs.

2013 
 26/01/2013, Received “Vietnam’s Most Potential Tech Startup Award”.
 03/2013, Setup the first oversea office in Singapore.
 04/2013, Set up business representative offices in HCM city & Indonesia.
 9/2013, Presented onClan, the first gaming social network for mobile gamers, in TechCrunch Disrupt 2013 in San Francisco.

2014 
 04/2014, Launched Gamehub, the first game portal specialized for mobile gamers.
 12/2014, 22 million users in Vietnam and Southeast Asia on Appota platform.

2015 
 01/2015, Launched Applancer, a mobile outsourcing platform.
09/2015, Introduced AppotaPay, Adsota.

2016 
 2016, Changed the slogan to "Technology For Change".

2017 
 02/2017, Appota launched AppotaX, for mobile publishers based on Google Ad Exchange Platform.
 03/2017, Appota closed an undisclosed Series C round from Korea Investment Partners and Mirae Asset Venture Investment.
 10/2017, Adsota became The Official Facebook Agency in Vietnam

2018 
 01/2018, Adsota Vietnam received a strategic investment from Korea's TNK Factory to conquer Southeast Asia's mobile advertising market.
 03/2018, Appota announces the fully acquisition of WiFi Chua
 05/2018, Appota introduced OTA Network.
 08/2018, Appota founded Takademy.

2018 
 02/2019, Appota changed the slogan to “Entertainment Ecosystem”
 04/2019, Appota Esports organized World Cyber Game 2019 - Vietnam qualifying round.
08/2019, Appota became a member of Vietnam E-commerce Association (VECOM).
12/2019, Appota officially jumped into the smarthome field with the AppotaHome project and launched the sales of AppotaLock AS-1 smart lock accessories and AppotaLock AN-1 smart lock.

2020 
04/2020, AppotaHome has officially launched the smart fingerprint lock AM1 to improve customer's asset security.
07/2020, OTA Network in cooperation with Facebook Gaming to launch OTA Plus project.
10/2020, AppotaPay is officially licensed by the State Bank Vietnam to join the e-wallet market as a payment intermediary.

2021 
 01/2021, AppotaPay and South Asia Commercial Joint Stock Bank held the Signing Ceremony of the Bilateral Cooperation Agreement.
 03/2021, AppotaPay and Orient Commercial Joint Stock Bank (OCB) held a signing ceremony of the Cooperation Agreement. 
 04/2021, OTA Network organized the Vietnam Creators Summit 2021 event with the participation of the top 100 streamer in Vietnam. 
 04/2021, Appota awarded the Sao Khue Award in the field of digital transformation with Human Resource Management solution - ACheckin.

Products and Services

Digital content and online entertainment

Gamota

Gamota is one of the three main game publishers leading Vietnamese market with games such as: Tru Tien 3D, Vainglory, Survival Heroes Vietnam, Tieu Ngao Giang Ho Mobile, Ai My Nhan, Tien Nghich.

Adsota 
Adsota provides mobile marketing platform.

In 2017, Adsota became the exclusive partner of AppotaX, a mobile ads optimization platform on Google Ad Exchange.

On January 18, 2018, Adsota - a mobile advertising services provider in Vietnam and TNK Factory - an advertising services provider under Kakao Group Korea, officially announced a strategic investment deal to tap the mobile advertising market in Southeast Asia.

AppotaPay 
AppotaPay provides payment intermediary services as well as electronic wallet, payment gateways and collection services.

AppotaPay is the 39th licensed payment intermediary services unit approved by the State Bank of Vietnam

References 

Vietnamese brands
Information technology companies of Vietnam
Companies based in Hanoi
Vietnamese companies established in 2011
Technology companies established in 2011